Keni Burke is the debut solo album by former Five Stairsteps member Keni Burke. Released in 1977, on George Harrison's Dark Horse Records label. "Shuffle" and "Day", were released as singles in the US, with "From Me to You" and "Keep On Singing" as B-sides, respectively. The sleeve states: "Special thanks to George Harrison and Dennis Morgan for making this album possible."

Track listing
Side one
"Keep on Singing" (Keni Burke, Day Askey Burke) – 4:40
"You Are All Mine" (K. Burke, D. A. Burke)– 3:02
"Day" (K. Burke) – 2:48
"It's the Last Time" (K. Burke, D. A. Burke)– 4:06
"Shuffle" (K. Burke, D. A. Burke) – 3:39

Side two
"Give All You Can Give" (K. Burke, Ronnie Vann) – 4:00
"Tell Me That You Love Me" (K. Burke, Vann) – 4:03
"Something New (Like a Sweet Melody)" (K. Burke, Vann) – 4:23
"From Me to You" (K. Burke) – 4:08

Personnel
Keni Burke - vocals, bass, Fender Rhodes, guitar, Mini Moog, backing vocals
Johnny McGhee, John McLain - guitar
Ronnie Vann - rhythm guitar
Don Farrell, Jim Studer, Dean Gant, Sonny Burke - keyboards
Alvin Taylor, Teddy Sparks - drums
Mayuto Correa, James "Alibe" Sledge, Babatunde Olatunji - percussion
Ernest J. Watts, George R. Bohanon, Oscar Brashear - horns
Dan Askey Burke, Ivory Stone, Ricky Williams - backing vocals
Strings and horns arranged by Keni Burke and Gil Askey

References

External links
 Keni Burke-Keni Burke at Discogs

1977 debut albums
Keni Burke albums
Dark Horse Records albums
Albums recorded at Total Experience Recording Studios